Alier is a name. Notable people with this name include:

 Abel Alier (born 1933), South Sudanese politician and judge
 Alier Ashurmamadov (born 1970), Tajikistani footballer
 Joan Martinez Alier (born 1939), Spanish economist
 Lorenzo Alier Cassi (1878–1942), Spanish lawyer and politician